Hailufeng may refer to:

Hailufeng, the region of Shanwei City of Guangdong. 
Hailufeng dialect, spoken in Shanwei, Haifeng and Lufeng in Guangdong, China
Hailufeng Soviet, Chinese Soviet territory in 1927